Hjorth Hill is a rounded, ice-free mountain,  high, standing just north of New Harbour and  south of Hogback Hill, in Victoria Land, Antarctica. The hill is separated from the MacDonald Hills by Quinn Gully.  It was charted by the British Antarctic Expedition, 1910–13, led by Robert Falcon Scott, and was named for the maker of the primus lamps used by the expedition. The name is spelled "Hjort's Hill" in the popular narrative of Scott's expedition, but "Hjorth's Hill" is used on the map accompanying the narrative. The recommended spelling is based upon the form consistently used on the maps accompanying the expedition's scientific reports.

References

Mountains of Victoria Land
Scott Coast